Echinops niveus is a species in the genus Echinops or globe thistles. It is native to the Indian subcontinent: Himachal Pradesh, Jammu and Kashmir, Uttar Pradesh, Nepal.

Nivetin is a neoflavonoid isolated from E. niveus.

References

External links

niveus
Flora of Nepal
Flora of West Himalaya